Mike Rodrigue (born January 17, 1960) is a former Canadian football wide receiver in the Canadian Football League who played for the Montreal Concordes. He played college football for the Miami Hurricanes.

He played quarterback at Miami.

References

1960 births
Living people
American football wide receivers
Canadian football wide receivers
American football quarterbacks
Montreal Concordes players
Miami Hurricanes football players